Redelinghuys is a village in the Bergrivier Local Municipality in the Western Cape province of South Africa, located about  north of Cape Town on the Verlorevlei River. The 2001 Census recorded the population as 581 people in 167 households. The village is situated on the R366 regional route between Piketberg and Elands Bay. It is served by a police station, a public library, a satellite health clinic, and two primary schools.

The town has a predominantly Victorian architecture.

Verlorenvlei

On 23 September 2014 a part of the southern shore of the vlei was declared as a provincial heritage site for reasons associated with the vernacular fishing village located there. On the same date the Diepkloof Rock Shelter, an internationally important archaeological site associated with the emergence of modern humans and intrinsically connected to the ecology of the vlei, was also declared.

References

Populated places in the Bergrivier Local Municipality
Ramsar sites in South Africa